Colombia has one time zone, Colombia Time (COT), which is located in the UTC−05:00 zone, 5 hours behind Coordinated Universal Time (UTC). Its standard time zone abbreviation is COT.

Colombia does not observe daylight saving time, but used it during eleven months between May 1992 and April 1993.

IANA time zone database
In the IANA time zone database Colombia has the following time zone:
America/Bogota (CO)

See also
 daylight saving time in Colombia

References

External links
 GMT: Greenwich Mean Time - World Time / Time in every Time Zone

 
Colombia